Vesselowskya rubifolia, commonly known as southern marara, red ash, mountain marara or Dorrigo southern marara, is a species of flowering plant in the family Cunoniaceae plant and has a restricted distribution in eastern New South Wales. It is a shrub or small tree with compound leaves with three or five leaflets with serrated edges, and small whitish flowers arranged along a raceme.

Description
Its young growth, parts of the leaves and flowers are covered with long hairs flattened against the surface. The leaves are arranged in opposite pairs, each with three or five elliptical leaflets with sharply-pointed serrations on the edges, the leaflets all attached to a single point on the end of the petiole.

Taxonomy
Southern marara was first formally described in 1860 by Ferdinand von Mueller in Fragmenta phytographiae Australiae and was given the name Geissois rubiflora, from specimens collected from Clouds Creek by Hermann Beckler. In 1905, Renato Pampanini changed the name to Vesselowskya rubifolia in the journal Annali di botanica.

Distribution and habitat
Vesselowskya rubifolia is usually found in cool temperate rainforest with Antarctic Beech and occurs from Barrington Tops to north-west of Dorrigo.

References

Flora of New South Wales
Cunoniaceae
Oxalidales of Australia
Plants described in 1860
Taxa named by Ferdinand von Mueller